Dizdarević is a Bosniak occupational surname, taken from the Perso-Turkish word dizdar meaning "castle warden". Notable people with the surname include:

Belmin Dizdarević (born 2001), Bosnian footballer
Emir Dizdarević (born 1958), Bosnian chess grandmaster
Faik Dizdarević (1929–2011), journalist, director of RTV Sarajevo
Nađa Dizdarević, Bosnian citizen and activist
Nenad Dizdarević (born 1955), film director, screenwriter, producer, and teacher of cinema from Sarajevo, Bosnia and Herzegovina
Raif Dizdarević (born 1926), former Yugoslav politician of Bosniak ethnicity
Slaven Dizdarević (born 1981), Slovak decathlete
Srđan Dizdarević (1952–2016), journalist and activist
Zija Dizdarević (1916–1942), Bosnian prose writer

Bosnian surnames